Mystery Sea Raider is a 1940 American drama war film directed by Edward Dmytryk and starring Carole Landis, Henry Wilcoxon and Onslow Stevens.

Plot
A woman (Carole Landis) and a U.S. captain (Henry Wilcoxon) foil a German spy's (Onslow Stevens) plan to use their freighter to sink a British ship.

Cast
 Carole Landis as June McCarthy
 Henry Wilcoxon as Captain Jimmy Madden
 Onslow Stevens as Carl Cutler
 Kathleen Howard as Maggie Clancy
 Wally Rairden as Blake, 3rd Mate (as Wallace Rairdon)
 Sven Hugo Borg as Sven
 Henry Victor as Cmdr. Bulow
 Roland Varno as Lt. Schmidt
 Louis Adlon as Lerner
 Willy Kaufman as Lt. Felder
 Monte Blue as Captain Norberg
 Matthew Boulton as Captain Howard
 Gohr Van Vleck as Captain Van Wyck
 Jean Del Val as Captain Benoit
 Kay Linaker as Flossie La Mare
 Reed Howes as Hughes, Carl's Chauffeur
 Phil Warren as Sparks, Radio Operator (as Philip Wareen)

References

External links
 

1940 films
1940 drama films
American war drama films
1940s war drama films
American black-and-white films
Films directed by Edward Dmytryk
Paramount Pictures films
1940s English-language films
1940s American films